Marco Leonardi (born 14 November 1971) is an Italian actor.

Leonardi was born in Australia to Italian parents. He moved to Italy at the age of four and at 17 starred in the acclaimed Italian film Cinema Paradiso (1988). He later starred in the Mexican movie Like Water for Chocolate (1992). He has made several movies in the United States, including Once Upon a Time in Mexico and From Dusk Till Dawn 3: The Hangman's Daughter (2000). Other appearances include the Canadian film The Five Senses (1999).

Filmography

Film

 La Sposa era Bellissima (1987, directed by Pál Gábor) - Giuseppe
 Il Coraggio di Parlare (1987, directed by Leandro Castellani) - Fortunato, the shepard
 Ultimo Minuto (1987, directed by Pupi Avati) - Paolo
 Ciao Ma (1988, directed by Giandomenico Curi) - Paolo
 Cinema Paradiso (1988, directed by Giuseppe Tornatore) - Salvatore 'Totò' Di Vita - Teenager
 Scugnizzi (1989, directed by Nanni Loy) - Salvatore
 Dimenticare Palermo (1990, directed by Francesco Rosi)
 Ferdinando, un uomo d'amore (1990, directed by Mème Perlini) - Ferdinando
 Like Water for Chocolate (1992, directed by Alfonso Arau) - Pedro Muzquiz
 La Ribelle (1993, directed by Aurelio Grimaldi) - Sebastiano
 Le Buttane (1994, directed by Aurelio Grimaldi) - Maurizio
 Viva San Isidro (1995, directed by Alessandro Cappeletti) - Quintino
 Manhattan Merengue! (1995) - Carmelo
  (1995) - Eddie Sanchez
 Banditi (1995, directed by Stefano Mignucci) - David
 La sindrome di Stendhal (1996, directed by Dario Argento) - Marco Longhi
 Italiani (1996, directed by Maurizio Ponzi) - Fortunato
 Para vivir o morir (1996)
 La frontiera (1996, directed by Franco Giraldi) - Franco Velich
 My Brother Jack (1997) - Jack Casale
 Una vacanza all'inferno (1997, directed by Tonino Valerii) - Angelo
 I cinque sensi (1999, directed by Jeremy Podeswa) - Roberto 'Luigi'
 From Dusk Till Dawn 3: The Hangman's Daughter (2001, directed by P. J. Pesce) - Johnny Madrid
 The Knights of the Quest (2001, directed by Pupi Avati) - Ranieri di Panico
 Texas Rangers (2001) - Jesus Sandoval
 It's Better to Be Wanted for Murder Than Not to Be Wanted at All (2003) - Ben Clemons
 Once Upon a Time in Mexico (2003, directed by Robert Rodriguez) - Fideo
 Mary (2005, directed by Abel Ferrara) - Apostle Peter
 Maradona, La Mano de Dios (2007) - Diego Maradona
 Red Gold (2009)
 Cha cha cha (2013) - Fotografo
 Anime nere (2014) - Luigi
 Ustica: The Missing Paper (2016) - Corrado di Acquaformosa
 Worldly Girl (2016) - Celestino
 The Space Between (2016) - Di Stasio
 Prigioniero della mia libertà (2016) - Sovritendente Maggio
 A Family (2017) - Pietro
 All the Money in the World (2017, directed by Ridley Scott) - Mammoliti
 La banalità del crimine (2018) - Conte
 The Last Man (2018) - Antonio
 Soledad (2018) - Belmonte
 Lucania (2019) - Fortunato
 Aspromonte - La terra degli ultimi (2019) - Cosimo
 From the Vine (2019) - Luca
 Martin Eden (2019) - Bernardo Fiore
 The Great Salento war(2022) - Ernesto

Television
 Villa Maltraversi (1993, TV Movie, directed by Fabrizio Laurenti) - Mirko Cavicchi
 Pensando all'Africa (1998, directed by Ruggero Deodato)
 Elisa di Rivombrosa (2003, directed by Cinzia Torrini) - Gaetano Capece (2005)
 Don Matteo 4 (2004, directed by Andrea Barzini and Giulio Base) - Saverio Donini
 San Pietro (2005, directed by Giulio Base) - Marco
 Il Capo dei Capi (2007, directed by Enzo Monteleone and Alexis Sweet)
 L'ultimo padrino (2008, directed by Marco Risi) - Emanuele alias 'Africano'

External links

1971 births
Australian male film actors
Australian people of Italian descent
Italian male film actors
Living people
20th-century Italian male actors
21st-century Italian male actors